Lady Sarah Margaret Clutton (née Fitzalan-Howard; 23 September 1941 – 14 June 2015) was a British aristocrat and philanthropist.

Life
Born Lady Sarah Fitzalan-Howard on 23 September 1941, she was the third of four daughters of Bernard Fitzalan-Howard, 16th Duke of Norfolk and The Hon. Lavinia Strutt. She had two older sisters, Anne Cowdrey, 14th Lady Herries of Terregles, and Mary Mumford, 15th Lady Herries of Terregles, and one younger sister, Jane Kerr, Marchioness of Lothian. She grew up at the family seat Arundel Castle in West Sussex. 

Upon her father's death in 1975, while the dukedom of Norfolk and his other titles passed to his distant male cousin, her elder sister Anne inherited the Scottish lordship of Herries of Terregles, upon Anne's death the title went to her second eldest sister, Mary. Lady Sarah remained heiress presumptive throughout her life. In 1943, Lady Sarah and her family posed for Cecil Beaton at Arundel Castle in a series of portraits now in the National Portrait Gallery.

From 1978 until 2011, she was director of the Roman Catholic Diocese of Arundel and Brighton's pilgrimage to the Sanctuary of Our Lady of Lourdes. She played a key role in the founding of Chestnut Tree House, the children's hospice for Sussex and South East Hampshire. She donated the land the hospice was built on and served as president. She succeeded her mother as president of St Barnabas House Hospice in Worthing upon the latter's death in 1996.

Personal life and death
On 25 March 1988, she married Nigel Hugh Clutton. Lady Sarah Clutton died at home on 14 June 2015 at the age of 73. A private funeral was held and a memorial mass at Arundel Cathedral on 23 September. A memorial orchard at Chestnut Tree House was unveiled by her husband in 2017.

References

1943 births
2015 deaths
Jane
Fitzalan-Howard
British Roman Catholics
British philanthropists